Nordic combined at the 1980 Winter Olympics, consisted of one event, held from 18 February to 19 February. The ski jumping portion took place at Lake Placid Olympic Ski Jumping Complex, while the cross-country portion took place at Lake Placid Olympic Sports Complex Cross Country Biathlon Center.

Medal summary

Medal table

Events

Individual

Athletes did three normal hill ski jumps, with the lowest score dropped. They then raced a 15 kilometre cross-country course, with the time converted to points. The athlete with the highest combined points score was awarded the gold medal.

Participating NOCs

Nine nations participated in Nordic combined at the Lake Placid Games.

References

External links
 Sports-Reference - 1980 Olympics - Nordic Combined - Individual

 
1980 Winter Olympics events
1980
1980 in Nordic combined
Nordic combined competitions in the United States
Men's events at the 1980 Winter Olympics